Feralia Planitia is the third-largest known impact crater on the asteroid Vesta, after Rheasilvia and Veneneia. It is one of several old, degraded impact basins that predate the Rheasilvia basin that now dominates Vesta.

References

Impact craters on asteroids
Surface features of 4 Vesta